William Allen Edwards (born August 28, 1971) is an American former professional basketball player. He was a 2.03 m (6'8") tall small forward-power forward. During his playing career, his nickname was "Dollar Bill" Edwards.

College career
Edwards played college basketball at Wright State University, with the Wright State Raiders, where he became one of the school's legends. He was voted the Summit League Player of the Year in 1993.

Professional career
Edwards was never drafted by an NBA franchise, and despite having played a few games with the Philadelphia 76ers during the 1993–94 season, it was in Europe that he had a significant 12-year career. He played in the EuroLeague with the Greek club PAOK, in the 1999–00 season, and in the FIBA SuproLeague, with the French club ASVEL, in the 2000–01 season.

National team career
Edwards was a member of the bronze medal-winning senior men's Team USA at the 1998 FIBA World Championship.

Personal life
Edwards is the father of former Middletown High School standouts Bill Edwards Jr., who on May 6, 2009, signed a Letter of Intent to play college basketball for Penn State, and Vincent Edwards, a former NBA player, who played college basketball for Purdue.

Career pro stats (national domestic leagues)

References

External links
NBA.com Profile
FIBA Archive Profile
FIBA Europe Profile
Eurobasket.com Profile
ProBallers.com Profile

1971 births
Living people
1998 FIBA World Championship players
20th-century African-American sportspeople
21st-century African-American sportspeople
AEK B.C. players
African-American basketball players
American expatriate basketball people in France
American expatriate basketball people in Germany
American expatriate basketball people in Greece
American expatriate basketball people in Israel
American expatriate basketball people in Italy
American expatriate basketball people in Spain
American men's basketball players
ASVEL Basket players
CB Girona players
EWE Baskets Oldenburg players
Hapoel Jerusalem B.C. players
Israeli Basketball Premier League players
Köln 99ers players
Liga ACB players
Pallacanestro Varese players
Pallacanestro Virtus Roma players
P.A.O.K. BC players
Philadelphia 76ers players
Power forwards (basketball)
Scaligera Basket Verona players
Sioux Falls Skyforce (CBA) players
Small forwards
Undrafted National Basketball Association players
United States men's national basketball team players
Virtus Bologna players
Wright State Raiders men's basketball players